Ole Martin Moen (born 28 April 1985) is a Norwegian philosopher who works primarily with applied ethics and value theory. He is Professor of Ethics at Oslo Metropolitan University and Researcher in Philosophy and Principal Investigator for the 5-year research project "What should not be bought and sold?" at the University of Oslo, funded by the Research Council of Norway.

Education and career 
Moen received a PhD in philosophy from the University of Oslo in 2013; his dissertation was on hedonism. As a master's student, he was at times affiliated with the University of California, Berkeley and the University of Oxford. During his doctoral studies, he also stayed at the University of Oxford.

Moen has published articles in journals such as the Journal of Medical Ethics, Journal of Bentham Studies, Philosophia, Reason Papers and Think. He has written on a number of controversial topics, including prostitution, active euthanasia, animal welfare, wild animal suffering, school, cosmetic surgery, monogamy, cryonics and transhumanism. Moen's articles have been published in Forbes, The Independent, Washington Times, Aftenposten and Morgenbladet. He is a in-house philosopher on the Norwegian radio show Verdibørsen and runs the podcast Moralistene with Aksel Braanen Sterri.

Together with two other teachers, he established the Humanistskolen in Oslo ("Humanist School in Oslo"). The school was initially refused approval from the Ministry of Education, but after the Ministry of Gender Equality and Discrimination Ombud (LDO) came to the conclusion that the Ministry had refused in contravention of the law, the school nevertheless received approval.

Politics 
Moen was elected to the Øvre Eiker municipal council for the Progress Party in 2003 and served two years. In 2004, Moen announced his transition to the Liberal People's Party and justified it by saying that "the fight for a liberal FRP has been lost". In December 2005, he announced a move from the municipality, and Snorre Rogstad (Frp) thus took over the position as municipal council representative. Moen has also been secretary of Øvre Eiker Progress Party, deputy leader of the youth organization Liberalistisk Ungdom, leader of Liberalistisk Ungdoms fylkeslag in Oslo, leader of Human-Ethisk Studentlag and project employee at Civita in 2007. Moen has not had any office or association with party politics since leaving the Liberal People's Party.

Awards 
In the article on Peter Wessel Zapffe's philosophy, he argues against Zapffe's antinatalism, instead claiming that we should focus on improving the human condition using biotechnology.

Publications

Articles

Books

References

External links 

 
 Moralistene - Moen's podcast (in Norwegian)
 Moen on the Unabomber's Ethics - Philosophical Disquisitions: Podcast (Episode #51)
 Interview with Michael Pollan (video)
 Interview with Peter Singer (video)

1985 births
Living people
21st-century Norwegian philosophers
Animal ethicists
Bioethicists
Environmental ethicists
Hedonism
Transhumanists
Academic staff of Oslo Metropolitan University
University of Oslo alumni
Academic staff of the University of Oslo